Yavatmal Terminus is a small railway station in Yavatmal district in the Indian state of Maharashtra.  Its code is YTL. It serves Yavatmal city. The station consists of two platforms. The platforms are not well sheltered. The station lacks many facilities including water and sanitation.

Historic Shakuntala Express used to runs starts from this station.

Initial work on Yavatmal New Railway station started. It will be constructed behind Z.P school Arni road Yavatmal.

Trains 
 Yavatmal–Murtajapur NG Passenger (unreserved)

Currently no rail on this route.

References

Railway stations in Yavatmal district
Bhusawal railway division
Railway stations opened in 1912
1912 establishments in India
Railway terminus in India
Yavatmal